Rodney McKinnie Alexander (born December 5, 1946) is an American politician and member of the Republican Party who served as the Secretary of the Louisiana Department of Veterans Affairs from September 30, 2013, until June 3, 2014. First elected as a Democrat, he changed parties in 2004 to run as a Republican and was re-elected five times. His district covered twenty-four parishes in roughly the northeast quadrant of the state but stretched much further south as a result of the 2010 census.

On August 6, 2013, Alexander announced that he would not seek a seventh term in the House in the 2014 congressional elections. He cited his weariness with partisanship in Washington, D.C. as the primary reason for his decision to retire. On August 7, Alexander moved up his timetable for departure from Congress. He resigned his seat effective September 27; a special election was held to replace him, and an upset victory went to a political newcomer without support from the Republican leadership, Vance McAllister, a businessman from Monroe, who was defeated for a full term in the 2014 midterm elections.

Alexander joined the administration of Governor Bobby Jindal as the new secretary of the Louisiana Department of Veterans Affairs but remained in that post for only eight months.

Background
Alexander was born in the village of Bienville in Bienville Parish to the former Mary Crawford and James Earl Alexander. In 1964, he graduated from Jonesboro-Hodge High School in Jonesboro in Jackson Parish, which is often cited as his hometown. He then attended Louisiana Tech University in Ruston, but he left college to work for his family construction company.

Alexander served in the U.S. Air Force Reserve from 1965 to 1971. He owned a construction company from 1964 to 1981. From 1972 to 1988, he was a member of the Jackson Parish Police Jury (equivalent to county commission in other states). He was an insurance agent prior to entering Congress.

Alexander left the police jury to represent District 13 in the Louisiana House of Representatives from 1988 until his election to Congress in 2002. While in the state House, he served as the chairman of the House Health and Welfare Committee. In this position, her shepherded to passage the Louisiana Children's Health Insurance Program (LaCHIP), which assists mothers and children with basic health care and insurance needs.

Alexander enrolled in college courses intermittently for forty-five years. When the University of Louisiana at Monroe began to offer online courses, he enrolled for two years and graduated from ULM with a degree in general studies in 2009.

U.S. House of Representatives

Elections
2002
Alexander won his seat in 2002 as a Democrat, but ran in 2004 as a Republican, changing parties on 6 August 2004, only three months before the election and only 30 minutes before the filing deadline. The move was derided by Democrats Robert Matsui and Mary Landrieu as being "cowardly".

2004
On August 4, 2004, he registered to run as a Democrat, but changed his registration to Republican two days later. He then defeated a fellow Republican, the late Jock Scott of Alexandria in the open primary that November. In 2006, he defeated the Democrat Gloria Williams Hearn, wife of the psychologist George E. Hearn of Pineville, Louisiana. His party switch became official on August 9, 2004.

2010

Alexander defeated Richard Todd Slavant of Monroe in the Republican closed primary by a margin of nearly 9–1. He faced Independent Tom Gibbs, Jr., of Ouachita Parish in the November 2 general election and won easily. No Democratic candidate had filed for the position, once held by such long-serving party members as Jerry Huckaby and Otto Passman. During this election, he joined the Tea Party Caucus.

2012
Alexander drew two last-minute challengers in his successful 2012 bid for a sixth term in the U.S. House. Alexander handily prevailed with 202,531 votes (77.8 percent). The Libertarian Clay Steven Grant received 20,194 votes (7.8 percent), and the No-Party candidate, Ron Caesar, polled 37,486 votes (14.4 percent).

During the 2012 election Alexander's campaign raised a total of $1,235,114. $942,083 were spent leaving the campaign with a surplus of $295,079 and no debt. Major contributors to Alexander's campaign came from a variety of business interests including the crop production industry, the oil and gas industry, commercial banks, and general contractors. Top individual contributors include Adams and Reese, the Livingston Group, O'Neal Gas, and Kadav Inc.

Tenure
At the commencement of the 111th Congress, Alexander received new subcommittee assignments including the Subcommittee on Energy and Water Development, the Subcommittee on Labor, Health and Human Services, Education, and Related Agencies (LHHS), and he retained his seat on the Subcommittee on Agriculture, Rural Development, Food and Drug Administrations, and Related Agencies (Agriculture).

His speeches include "Party of Paychecks" in which he speaks on the nations food-stamp necessity increase and speaks against "out-of-control government spending" and unemployment. Many of Alexander's other speeches include warning against tax increases and supporting religious freedom and public prayer.

Alexander's voting record shows a history of voting against tax law amendments on a variety of matters. He has also voted "Nay" on many extensions for relief or aid, regulations, and has voted "Yay" to prohibition of tax increase. In 2012, he voted for several pro-business, anti-environmental bills such as the Stop the War on Coal Act and the National Strategic and Critical Minerals Production Act. He has also voted to support small business through the Red Tape Reduction and Small Business Job Creation Act. Cumulatively, Alexander missed 266 of 7521 (3.5%) roll call votes during his time in office, higher than the national median of 2.5%.

Legislation
As a Representative, Alexander sponsored 36 bills, including:

108th Congress (2003–2004)
 H.R. 1724, a bill to require higher education institutions that participate in student assistance programs to offer military leave to members of the Armed Forces for deployment and provide credits or refunds of tuition and other fees during such leaves, introduced April 10, 2003

109th Congress (2005–2006)
 H.R. 3894, a bill to allow for emergency, temporary housing for victims of Hurricane Katrina, introduced September 26, 2005
 H.R. 5765, a bill to allow for a tax credit for employers equal to 15% of the first $10,000 in wages for members of the National Guard or Ready Reserve, introduced July 12, 2006. Alexander introduced a similar bill, H.R. 3620, in the 111th Congress.

110th Congress (2007–2008)
 H.R. 924, a bill to prohibit the Food and Drug Administration from restricting the sale of certain turtles to be kept as pets, introduced February 8, 2007
 H.R. 7008, a bill to set limits on disaster relief financial aid given to private or investor-owned electric utility companies that provide service to low-income households, introduced September 23, 2008, reintroduced in the 111th Congress as H.R. 941

111th Congress (2009–2010)
 H.R. 1891, a bill to allow for a gross income deduction for 50% of long-term care premiums without regard to other limitations on deductions, introduced April 2, 2009

113th Congress (2013–2014)
 H.R. 1989, a bill to require the United States Forest Service to endeavor to accommodate individuals with mobility disabilities who would need to use a power-driven mobility device for access to Forest Service lands, introduced May 15, 2013
 H.R. 2752, a bill to exclude seasonal employees from being counted under the Patient Protection and Affordable Care Act's employer mandate, introduced July 19, 2013
 H.R. 2926, a bill to prohibit the federal government from revoking or withholding federal financial assistance that would otherwise be provided to any recipient on the basis of religious activities that are conducted voluntarily and initiated by participants in a program or activity carried out by such recipient, introduced August 1, 2013

Committee assignments
 Committee on Appropriations
 Subcommittee on Energy and Water Development
 Subcommittee on Financial Services and General Government
 Subcommittee on Labor, Health and Human Services, Education, and Related Agencies (Vice Chair)

Caucus membership
 Congressional Caucus on Turkey and Turkish Americans
 Congressional Diabetes Caucus
 International Conservation Caucus
 Republican Study Committee
 Sportsmen's Caucus
 Tea Party Caucus
Congressional Constitution Caucus

Interest group ratings
Alexander received favorable ratings from pro-life groups such as the Right to Life Committee and received low ratings from Planned Parenthood. Alexander also received favorable reviews from business groups such as the Chamber of Commerce and the National Federation of Independent Business. In addition, he had strong support from agricultural groups such as the American Farm Bureau Federation which gave him a 100 percent rating in 2011 and the Sportsman and Animal Owners Voting Alliance. Alexander has been given low ratings by civil rights groups such as the NAACP and the ACLU as well as environmental groups like the Defenders of Wildlife Action Fund.

Endorsements
Alexander was endorsed by Americans for Legal Immigration, Louisiana National Federation of Independent Business, National Federation of Independent Business, Chamber of Commerce, and the National Rifle Association. The National Federation for Independent Business named Alexander a "Guardian of Small Business" to acknowledge his strong voting record in favor of small businesses.

Secretary of the Louisiana Department of Veterans Affairs
On September 30, 2013, Alexander became Secretary of the Louisiana Department of Veterans Affairs under Governor Bobby Jindal.

Political future
On August 13, 2013, Alexander said that he was considering running for governor in 2015, when Jindal would become term-limited. Other Republicans who were expected in that contest were Lieutenant Governor Jay Dardenne and State Treasurer John Neely Kennedy, with Louisiana Public Service Commissioner Scott Angelle and U.S. Senator David Vitter having already announced their candidacies. Democratic State Representative John Bel Edwards of Amite in Tangipahoa Parish had also announced his candidacy and was ultimately victorious.

Personal life
Alexander's wife, the former Nancy Sutton, is a long-time educator. They have three children and several grandchildren.

On January 30, 2010, Alexander, along with the late Charlton Lyons of Shreveport, former state Representative Risley C. Triche of Napoleonville, and former State Senator Randy Ewing, also of Jackson Parish, was inducted into the Louisiana Political Museum and Hall of Fame in Winnfield.

Alexander is a Southern Baptist.

See also

 List of American politicians who switched parties in office
 List of members of the 110th United States Congress who have served in the United States military
 List of United States representatives who switched parties

References

External links

Congressman Rodney Alexander official U.S. House website

Profile at SourceWatch

|-

|-

1946 births
Living people
Louisiana Republicans
Jonesboro-Hodge High School alumni
Louisiana Tech University alumni
Members of the Louisiana House of Representatives
Parish jurors and commissioners in Louisiana
People from Bienville, Louisiana
People from Jonesboro, Louisiana
Democratic Party members of the United States House of Representatives from Louisiana
Republican Party members of the United States House of Representatives
Southern Baptists
State cabinet secretaries of Louisiana
Tea Party movement activists
United States Air Force airmen
University of Louisiana at Monroe alumni
20th-century American politicians
21st-century American politicians
United States Air Force reservists
Baptists from Louisiana
Members of Congress who became lobbyists